"You Wanted the Best" is a song by the American hard rock band Kiss, released on their eighteenth studio album Psycho Circus in 1998. The song was written by the band's bassist Gene Simmons, and was released as the fourth single off the album on November 23, 1998. The song only charted on Billboard Mainstream Rock Tracks, reaching number 22. The band never performed the song live. It was the final recording to feature the original lineup and the only one to feature shared lead vocals among them.

Background
Gene Simmons, the sole writer of the song, said about the lyrics: "The lyrics talk about a time when everyone in the band was bitching at each other in the press. With family, there's always a mixture of affection and bickering. Listen, we're really servants of the people. Ultimately we have to brush aside our internal differences for the greater of the whole, the greater good, which is the fans. The least we owe them is to shut up, get up on stage and put out." The song is the only one where all band members share lead vocals. At first, the song was titled "Just Give Me Love" and was written in 1977, but Simmons changed the lyrics to make it as a story of the band members.

It is one of only three songs from the album where Ace Frehley played lead guitar, with the others being "Into the Void" and "In Your Face". Drums were not played by Peter Criss, but by Kevin Valentine, a session drummer who played on every track on the album, except "Into the Void".

"You Wanted the Best" was released as fourth single off Psycho Circus. It managed to chart only on Billboard Mainstream Rock Tracks, reaching number 22. Kiss never performed the song live.

Personnel
Credited personnel
Gene Simmons – bass, co-lead vocals
Paul Stanley – rhythm guitar, co-lead vocals
Ace Frehley – lead guitar, co-lead vocals
Peter Criss – co-lead vocals

Uncredited personnel
Kevin Valentine – drums

Charts

References

Kiss (band) songs
1998 singles
Mercury Records singles
Songs written by Gene Simmons
Song recordings produced by Bruce Fairbairn
1998 songs